K. Venugopal (born 10 December 1945), better known as K. Venu, is an Indian social commentator, writer, and activist from Kerala. He served in the Indian Communist (Naxalite) movement from 1970 to 1991 and has been a social activist since. He is now prominent as an author and columnist in newspapers and periodicals.

Amnesty International
In 2016, he supported Amnesty international in the controversy against ABVP.

Bibliography
His major works include:
 Prapanchavum Manushyanum
 Viplavathinte Darshanika Prasnangal
 Swathanthryathinte Sakshalkaram
 Kerala Padanathinoru Mukhavura
 Indian Viplavathinte Kazhchapad
 Oru Communistukarante Janadhipathya Sankalpam
 Oru Janadhipathyavadiyude Veenduvicharangal
 Indian Janadhipathyam Prasnangalum Sadhyathakalum
 Janadhipathyathinte Manushyanubhavangal

References

Activists from Kerala
Journalists from Kerala
Living people
1945 births